Goldenrods, Solidago species, are used as food plants by the larvae (caterpillars) of a number of Lepidoptera species including:

Monophagous species which feed exclusively on Solidago

Bucculatricidae ribbed cocoon makers:
B. magnella
B. niveella
B. solidaginella
B. speciosa
Coleophora case-bearers:
C. puberuloides
C. ramosella - feeds on S. virga-aurea
C. rugosae - feeds on S. rugosa
C. solidaginella - feeds on S. virga-aurea
C. triplicis - feeds on S. sempervirens

Polyphagous species which feed on Solidago among other plants

Bucculatrix angustata
Coleophora case-bearers:
C. acuminatoides
C. annulicola
C. duplicis
C. obscenella
Cremastobombycia solidaginis
Common pug (Eupithecia vulgata)
Dot moth (Melanchra persicariae)
Golden-rod pug (Eupithecia virgaureata)
Grey pug (Eupithecia subfuscata)
Lime-speck pug (Eupithecia centaureata)
Schinia species
S. nubila
S. nundina
Setaceous Hebrew character (Xestia c-nigrum)
V-pug (Chloroclystis v-ata)
Wormwood pug (Eupithecia absinthiata)

External links

Goldenrods
+Lepidoptera